Virgibacillus marismortui is a Gram-positive, moderately halophilic and rod-shaped  bacterium from the genus of Virgibacillus which has been isolated from water from the Dead Sea.

References

Bacillaceae
Bacteria described in 1999